Operation Spark  may refer to:

Operation Spark (Diversion), was a British diversionary World War II operation in 1940
Operation Spark (1940), an attempt by officers in the German Wehrmacht to dispose of Adolf Hitler
Operation Spark (1943), a military operation conducted by the Red Army in 1943 to lift the Siege of Leningrad
Operation Spark (1973), an operation designed to cover the Syrian and Egyptian military build-up in preparation for Operation Badr